Émile Henry (26 September 1872 – 21 May 1894) was a French anarchist, who on 12 February 1894 detonated a bomb at the Café Terminus in the Parisian Gare Saint-Lazare killing one person and wounding twenty.  

Though his activity in the anarchist movement was limited, he garnered much attention as a result of his crimes and of his age. He was also seen as one of the first people of a growing group of revolutionaries (largely anarchist) who subscribed to the doctrine of the "propaganda of the deed", which would later take the life of many governmental figures.

Early life 
Henry grew up in a liberal, aristocratic family with anarchist sympathies. They lived in exile in Spain for a time because his father, Fortuné Henry, had been a communard. He was condemned to death in absentia in 1873, and the family did not return to France until the amnesty in 1880. As a result, Henry was born in Barcelona and regaled from an early age with stories of state oppression. These anti-state attitudes were confirmed when the Spanish authorities confiscated the Henry family's property due to their political beliefs. Henry's father was forced to take a miserable factory job and died of mercury poisoning when Henry was only 10 years old. After the family returned to France, Henry's brother, an anarchist, eventually helped him establish connections with French revolutionary circles. Henry passed the writing portion of the entrance exam for the prestigious École Polytechnique, but he failed his oral exams and went on to find work as a trainee for an engineering firm.

Motivated by "a profound feeling of injustice", Henry became an anarchist in 1891 or 1892. He was at first opposed to violent actions that had the potential to cause harm to ordinary people, such as Ravachol's bombings of the living quarters of government officials, where workers and children could also be present. However, police repression of anarchists following Ravachol's capture soon convinced him otherwise.

Bombing of the Café Terminus 
Henry was furious over the state execution of fellow anarchist Auguste Vaillant. Motivated by the French Third Republic's endemic political corruption and the execution of Ravachol, Vaillant carried out a bomb attack on the French Chamber of Deputies on 9 December 1893. Although there were no fatalities, twenty deputies were injured. Henry took it upon himself to avenge Vaillant's death.

  
Historian John Merriman has suggested that the bombing of the Café Terminus, along with the Liceu bombing in Barcelona in 1893, was the first militant anarchist attack to target ordinary people, rather than representatives of the state itself. Henry saw the café as a representation of the bourgeoisie itself and his intent was to kill as many people as possible in the bombing. When brought to trial for these acts, he was asked by the courts why he had needlessly harmed so many innocent people, to which he replied, "…there are no innocent bourgeois", adding that his acts caused the "insolent triumphs" of the bourgeoisie to be shattered, and "its golden calf would shake violently on its pedestal, until the final blow knocks it into the gutter and pools of blood."

This was not Henry's first terrorist act; already on November 8, 1892, he had placed a time bomb at the offices of the Carmaux Mining Company, which had exploded when the police removed it, killing five officers in the commissariat on the rue des Bons-enfants. Indeed, after his arrest for the Terminus bombing, Henry took credit for a series of other bombings in Paris, and in his apartment was found material to make many more explosive devices.

Henry was executed by guillotine on 21 May 1894. His last words were reputed to be "Courage, camarades! Vive l'anarchie!"

Excerpts of Henry's address to the jury
I became an anarchist only recently. It was no longer ago than around mid-1891 that I threw myself into the revolutionary movement. Previously, I had lived in circles wholly permeated with the established morality. I had been accustomed to respecting and even cherishing the principles of the nation, family, authority and property.

But those educating the present generation all too often forget one thing – that life, indiscreet with its struggles and setbacks, its injustices and iniquities, sees to it that the scales are removed from the eyes of the ignorant and that they are opened to reality. Which was the case with me, as it is with everyone. I had been told that this life was easy and largely open to intelligent, vagarious people, and experience showed me that only cynics and lackeys can get a good seat at the banquet.

I had been told that society’s institutions were founded on justice and equality, and all around me I could see nothing but lies and treachery. Everyday I was disabused further. Everywhere I went, I witnessed the same pain in some, the same delights in others. It did not take me long to realize that the same great words that I had been raised to venerate: honor, devotion, duty were merely a mask hiding the most shameful turpitude. 

The factory-owner amassing a huge fortune on the back of the labor of his workers who lacked everything was an upright gentleman. The deputy, the minister whose hands were forever outstretched for bribes were committed to the public good. The officer testing his new model rifle on seven-year-old children had done his duty well, and in open parliament the premier offered him his congratulation. Everything I could see turned my stomach and my mind fastened on criticism of social organization. The criticism has been voiced too often to need rehearsing by me. Suffice it say that I turned into an enemy of a society which I held to be criminal. 

Momentarily attracted by socialism, I wasted no time in distancing myself from that party. My love of liberty was too great, my regard for individual initiative too great, my repudiation for feathering one’s nest too definite for me to enlist in the numbered army of the fourth estate. Also, I saw that, essentially, socialism changes the established order not one jot. It retains the authoritarian principle, and this principle, despite what supposed free-thinkers may say about it, is nothing but an ancient relic of the belief in a higher power. 

(...)In the merciless war that we have declared on the bourgeoisie, we ask no mercy. We mete out death and we must face it. For that reason I await your verdict with indifference. I know that mine  will not be the last head you will sever (...) You will add more names to the bloody roll call of our dead. 

Hanged in Chicago, beheaded in Germany, garroted in Xerez, shot in Barcelona, guillotined in Montbrison and in Paris, our dead are many; but you have not been able to destroy anarchy. Its roots go deep: its spouts from the bosom of a rotten society that is falling apart; it is a violent backlash against the established order; it stands for the aspirations to equality and liberty which have entered the lists against the current authoritarianism. It is everywhere. That is what makes it indomitable, and it will end by defeating you and killing you.

References

Bibliography 
John M. Merriman (2009). The Dynamite Club: How a Bombing in the Fin-De-Siecle Paris Ignited The Age of Modern Terror

External links 

Was this man the first terrorist of the modern age? at BBC News
Émile Henry Reference Archive at Marxists.org

1872 births
1894 deaths
Executed anarchists
Executed French people
French anarchists
People executed by the French Third Republic
People executed by France by guillotine
People from Barcelona
Spanish people executed abroad
Executed Spanish people
Anarchist assassins